Donovan Orlando Greer (born September 11, 1974) is a former American football cornerback in the National Football League for the Atlanta Falcons, New Orleans Saints, Buffalo Bills, Washington Redskins, and the Detroit Lions.  He played college football at Texas A&M University. In 2002, he appeared as himself in the TV film Second String.

1974 births
Living people
People from Houston
American football cornerbacks
Texas A&M Aggies football players
Atlanta Falcons players
New Orleans Saints players
Buffalo Bills players
Washington Redskins players
Detroit Lions players